The 2017 Lale Cup was a professional tennis tournament played on outdoor hard courts. It was the fifth edition of the tournament and part of the 2017 ITF Women's Circuit, offering a total of $60,000 in prize money. It took place in Istanbul, Turkey, from 10–16 April 2017.

Singles main draw entrants

Seeds 

 1 Rankings as of 3 April 2017

Other entrants 
The following players received wildcards into the singles main draw:
  Ayla Aksu
  Berfu Cengiz
  Başak Eraydın
  Pemra Özgen

The following players received entry into the singles main draw by a protected ranking:
  Mihaela Buzărnescu

The following players received entry from the qualifying draw:
  Katarzyna Kawa
  Pia König
  Petra Krejsová
  Sviatlana Pirazhenka

The following players received entry into the singles main draw by a lucky loser:
  Julia Terziyska

Champions

Singles

 Başak Eraydın def.  Petra Krejsová, 6–3, 6–0

Doubles

 Veronika Kudermetova /  İpek Soylu def.  Ksenia Lykina /  Polina Monova, 4–6, 7–5, [11–9]

External links 
 2017 Lale Cup at ITFtennis.com

2017 in Istanbul
2017 in Turkish tennis
2017 ITF Women's Circuit
April 2017 sports events in Turkey
2017
2017 in Turkish women's sport